Chaudière may refer to:

Places

Canada
Chaudière River, a tributary of the Saint Lawrence River, in Quebec, Canada
Chaudière River (Normandin River), a tributary of the Normandin River, in Lac-Ashuapmushuan, Quebec
Chaudière Falls on the Ottawa River between Ottawa, Ontario, and Gatineau, Québec
Chaudière Bridge, crossing the Ottawa River at the Chaudière Falls

France
 La Chaudière, a village and commune in the Drôme département of south-eastern France

Ships
  of the Royal Canadian Navy (1943–1946)
  of the Royal Canadian Navy and Canadian Forces (1959–1974)

Other uses 
 Le Régiment de la Chaudière, a Primary Reserve infantry regiment of the Canadian Forces

See also
 Chaudière-Appalaches, an administrative region in Quebec, Canada
 Terrasses de la Chaudière, a government office complex in Gatineau, Quebec, Canada
 Chutes-de-la-Chaudière (disambiguation)
 Les Chutes-de-la-Chaudière (disambiguation)